Nyanza-Lac Airport  was an airstrip serving Nyanza-Lac, a city in the Makamba Province of Burundi.

See also

Transport in Burundi
List of airports in Burundi

References

External links 
OpenStreetMap - Nyanza-Lac

Defunct airports
Airports in Burundi
Makamba Province